Oleni is a village and a former municipality in Elis, West Greece, Greece.
 
Since the 2011 local government reform it is part of the municipality Pyrgos, of which it is a municipal unit. The municipal unit has an area of 152.231 km2. The seat of the municipality was in Karatoula.
 
The municipal unit was named after the ruined medieval town Olena, which also gave its name to the Bishopric of Olena. It consists of a wide valley around Karatoula and Magoula, and the hills west and east of the valley. It is located about 10 km northeast of Pyrgos, 13 km northwest of Olympia and 20 km southeast of Amaliada. The largest community is Goumero. The ancient town Amphidolis was located near present Karatoula.

Subdivisions 
The municipal unit Oleni is subdivided into the following communities (constituent villages in brackets):
Agia Anna
Arvaniti
Charia
Cheimadio
Goumero
Karatoula (Karatoula, Kleidereika, Marmara)
Karya (Karya, Varvarina, Sitochori)
Klindia
Koutsochera
Lanthi (Lanthi, Moni Kremastis)
Latzoi (Latzoi, Agios Georgios, Almyriki, Grammatikos)
Magoula (Magoula, Katsomaliareika)
Mouzaki
Oleni
Pefki
Sopi

Historical population

References

Sources and external links
 Municipality Of Oleni Web Site
 Panoleniakos Karatoula Football Club

See also 
 List of settlements in Elis

Populated places in Elis